Brett Hart may refer to:
 Professional wrestlers:
Bret Hart  (born 1957), Canadian-American professional wrestler
Barry Horowitz (born 1960), American professional wrestler with the ring name Brett Hart

See also 
 Bret Harte (disambiguation)